Moturakina is an islet in Penrhyn Atoll (Tongareva) in the Cook Islands. It is in the middle of the southern rim of the atoll, between Atiati and Atutahi.

References

Penrhyn atoll